Obbligato is the third album by American jazz drummer Tom Rainey, which was recorded in 2013 and released by Intakt Records. He leads a quintet with  the same lineup as the collective LARK quartet (Rainey on drums, Ralph Alessi on trumpet, Ingrid Laubrock on sax and Kris Davis on piano), expanded by Drew Gress on bass. The album features a selection of standards, most of them taken from the Great American Songbook.

Reception

The Down Beat review by Peter Margasak says that "The most satisfying quality of the session is hearing the band members expertly blend together, suggesting the agile and empathic lines of West Coast jazz applied to fuzzy melodic shapes."

The All About Jazz review by Troy Collins states "Though unconstrained by formal concerns, the musicians always maintain some key aspects of the underlying structure of each piece, be it melody, harmony or rhythm. Such awareness of the tradition enriches the depth of their interpretations, making Obbligato one of the most persuasive modern recordings of established standards in some time."

In a review for JazzTimes,  Lloyd Sachs notes that "While the melodies are sometimes minimized, sometimes disguised, they always illuminate the core of the tunes."

Track listing
 "Just in Time" (Jule Styne) – 3:10
 "In Your Own Sweet Way" (Dave Brubeck) – 6:16
 "Long Ago and Far Away" (Jerome Kern) – 5:13
 "Reflections" (Thelonious Monk) – 5:21
 "Secret Love" (Sammy Fain) – 3:25
 "Prelude to a Kiss" (Duke Ellington) – 7:56
 "Yesterdays" (Jerome Kern) – 6:10
 "If I Should Lose You" (Ralph Rainger) – 4:58
 "You Don't Know What Love Is" (Gene de Paul) – 6:59
 "Just in Time Again" (Jule Styne) – 2:36

Personnel
Ralph Alessi – trumpet
Ingrid Laubrock – sax
Kris Davis – piano
Drew Gress – bass
Tom Rainey – drums

References

2014 albums
Intakt Records albums
Tom Rainey albums